Jozef Jarabinský (born 12 March 1944) is a former Czechoslovak football player and later a football manager of Carpatho-Rusyn origin.

He played for Slovan Bratislava, Bohemians, Dukla Prague and Sparta Prague.

As a football manager he coached Vagónka Poprad, Tatran Prešov, Sparta Prague, Slavia Prague (1992–93), Baník Ostrava (2001–02, 2004–05), Real Betis, Gençlerbirliği S.K. (1990–1991), Ankaragücü, Antalyaspor, Samsunspor, Izmir, Aris Thessaloniki F.C. and Tianjin Teda F.C. (2008).

References

External links
 
 
 
 

1944 births
Living people
People from Stará Ľubovňa District
Sportspeople from the Prešov Region
Czechoslovak footballers
Slovak footballers
Association football forwards
Dukla Prague footballers
AC Sparta Prague players
Czechoslovak First League players
Olympic footballers of Czechoslovakia
Footballers at the 1968 Summer Olympics
Slovak football managers
Czechoslovak football managers
1. FC Tatran Prešov managers
FC Nitra managers
Gençlerbirliği S.K. managers
Real Betis managers
AC Sparta Prague managers
FK Hvězda Cheb managers
Aris Thessaloniki F.C. managers
MKE Ankaragücü managers
Samsunspor managers
Antalyaspor managers
Göztepe S.K. managers
FC Baník Ostrava managers
SK Slavia Prague managers
Tianjin Jinmen Tiger F.C. managers
Süper Lig managers
Segunda División managers
Czech First League managers
Super League Greece managers
Chinese Super League managers
Czechoslovak expatriate football managers
Czechoslovak expatriate sportspeople in Spain
Czechoslovak expatriate sportspeople in Turkey
Czech expatriate football managers
Czech expatriate sportspeople in Turkey
Czech expatriate sportspeople in Greece
Czech expatriate sportspeople in China
Expatriate football managers in Spain
Expatriate football managers in Turkey
Expatriate football managers in Greece
Expatriate football managers in China
Bohemians 1905 players
SK Kladno players